Fantasy Springs Resort Casino is a casino and hotel located southeast of Palm Springs near I-10 in Indio, California. It is owned and operated by the Cabazon Band of Mission Indians, a federally recognized tribe.

History
The Indio Bingo Palace opened in 1991. In 1995, the Indio Bingo Palace closed and became the Fantasy Springs Casino. In October 2000, the casino underwent an expansion of its casino space.

In July 2003, Fantasy Springs Casino broke ground on a $145 million resort and a 97,000 square foot conference center. 

The Fantasy Springs Hotel and Casino opened on December 21, 2004 by $200 million refurbishment. The property was designed by CallisonRTKL Inc. (Previously RTKL Associates Inc.)

In late April 2007, the 18-hole Eagle Falls Golf Course at Fantasy Springs opened to the public.

Dining
 The Bistro
 JOY Asian Cuisine
 POM
 The Fresh Grill Buffet
 The Pizza Kitchen
 Starbucks Coffee
 Lique
 LIT
 12th Floor Cocktail Lounge & Wine Bar
 Rocky Mountain Chocolate Factory

Amenities
 Swimming Pool
 Special Events Center
 Rock Yard Music (Fridays and Saturdays)
 Fantasy Lanes
 Eagle Falls Golf Course
 Improv Comedy Club
 Nautilus Fitness Center

References

External links
 Official Website

Cahuilla
Casinos in Riverside County, California
Casino hotels
Indio, California
Native American casinos
Buildings and structures completed in 1991